A tellurite fluoride is a mixed anion compound containing tellurite and fluoride ions. They have also been called oxyfluorotellurate(IV) where IV is the oxidation state of tellurium in tellurite.

Comparable compounds are sulfite fluorides or selenite fluorides.

List

References 

Fluorides
Tellurites
Mixed anion compounds